Jarvisville is an unincorporated community in Harrison County, in the U.S. state of West Virginia.

History
A post office called Jarvisville was established in 1881, and remained in operation until 1909. The community was named after Charles Jarvis, who was credited with securing a post office for the town.

References

Unincorporated communities in Harrison County, West Virginia
Unincorporated communities in West Virginia